A New Morning, Changing Weather is the second studio album by The (International) Noise Conspiracy.

Track listing

Personnel
Ludwig Dahlberg – Drums
Inge Johansson – Bass, Backing Vocals
Lars Strömberg – Guitar, Backing Vocals
Dennis Lyxzén – Vocals, Tambourine
Sara Almgren – Organ, Guitar

Additional personnel
Jari Haapalainen – Producer, Engineer, Mastering, Extra Percussion, Additional Guitar on Track 10
Pelle Gunnerfeldt – Engineer, Mastering
Johan Gustavsson – Engineer, Backing Vocals on Track 4 and Track 7
Sven-Eric Dahlberg – Piano on Track 6, Rhodes Piano on Track 3
Karl Olsson – Additional Synth on Track 11
Björn Yttling – Horn arrangements, Piano on Track 7
Jonas Kullhammar – Saxophone on Track 3, Saxophone solo on Track 7
Markus Olsson – Saxophone on Track 3
Jonas Lidström – Backing Vocals on Track 3, Track 9 Track 11, Track 4 and Track 1
Mattias Lidström – Backing Vocals on Track 3, Track 9, Track 11, Track 4 and Track 1
Peder Stenberg – Backing Vocals on Track 3, Track 9, Track 11, Track 4 and Track 1
Liv-Marit Bergman – Backing Vocals on Track 4
Maria Andersson – Backing Vocals on Track 4
Hugo Sundkvist – Layout, Artwork

References

The (International) Noise Conspiracy albums
Epitaph Records albums
2001 albums
Burning Heart Records albums